Alfred Gary Rath (born January 10, 1973) is a former Major League Baseball left-handed pitcher. He has also played professionally in Japan, South Korea, and Taiwan.

Rath is a 1991 graduate of Long Beach (MS) High School. Rath played collegiately at Mississippi State University from 1992–1994 where he was a First Team All-SEC (1994) selection; a First Team All-American (Baseball America, ABCA); Second Team All American (Mizuno); and Third Team All American (NCSWA).  After the 1993 season, he played collegiate summer baseball with the Brewster Whitecaps of the Cape Cod Baseball League. As a junior in 1994 he was the Los Angeles Dodgers' 2nd round pick (47th overall) and made his major league debut on June 2, 1998 against the St. Louis Cardinals in Dodger Stadium.

References

External links

Career statistics and player information from Korea Baseball Organization

1973 births
American expatriate baseball players in Japan
American expatriate baseball players in South Korea
American expatriate baseball players in Taiwan
Living people
Major League Baseball pitchers
Baseball players from Mississippi
Sportspeople from Gulfport, Mississippi
Los Angeles Dodgers players
Minnesota Twins players
Mississippi State Bulldogs baseball players
Brewster Whitecaps players
KBO League pitchers
Haitai Tigers players
Kia Tigers players
Doosan Bears players
La New Bears players
Yomiuri Giants players
Tohoku Rakuten Golden Eagles players
Vero Beach Dodgers players
San Antonio Missions players
Albuquerque Dukes players
Salt Lake Buzz players
Trenton Thunder players
Tucson Sidewinders players
Long Island Ducks players
All-American college baseball players